Madness and the Minotaur is a text adventure, published in 1981 for the TRS-80 Color Computer by Radio Shack in North America and by Microdeal in the United Kingdom. It was developed by Spectral Associates founder, Thomas Rosenbaum.
A Dragon 32 version was published in 1982 by Dragon Data.

Gameplay
The goal of the game is to retrieve a number of treasures. In the course of doing this, the player will encounter other objects that may or may not be useful. Often, the player needs one object to act as a "key" for another.  There is no rhyme or reason to this. The player doesn't use the key object to obtain the other; he just needs to be carrying it.  For example, the player may see a shield. Perhaps the player needs to be carrying the dagger to get the shield.  If the player has the dagger, the shield is reachable; if he does not, it is not. With the exception of a randomly appearing "oracle", the game gives no indication of what objects are needed to reach a treasure. There are various magic spells that can be learned throughout the game that have various effects.

References

External links 
 
 Fan page

1980s interactive fiction
1981 video games
Adventure games
Dragon 32 games
Single-player video games
TRS-80 Color Computer games
Video games based on Greek mythology
Video games developed in the United States